Lynn Woods Reservation (founded 1881) is a  municipal forest park located in Lynn, Essex County, Massachusetts.  The City of Lynn's Department of Public Works, Park Commission and Lynn Water & Sewer Commission share jurisdiction and management of Lynn Woods Reservation.  The park encompasses nearly one-fifth of the entire land area of the city and represents a significant natural, watershed and public recreational resource in eastern Massachusetts.

The entire portion of the reservation with Lynn city bounds was added to the National Register of Historic Places in 1996 as a historic district. (A small portion of the park is actually in neighboring Saugus.)

History
The northwestern part of Lynn has long been public land, its southern sections used as pasture land as early as the 18th century.  Breed's Pond, at the southern end of the reservation, was dammed for industrial use in the 1840s, and Dungeon Rock became a tourist attraction in the 1850s.  Demands for improved water supply (for both consumption and fire suppression) in the 1860s led to organized activities to conserve the woodlands surround Breed's and Walden Ponds.  In 1881 the Trustees for the Free Public Forest were established to oversee the area.  They were folded into a newly organized Lynn Parks Department in 1889 to manage  of water supply and park land in the reservation; this grew to the current  in 1892.  The Happy Valley Golf Course was developed in the 1930s, as was the road and trail network that covers the park.

See also
National Register of Historic Places listings in Lynn, Massachusetts
National Register of Historic Places listings in Essex County, Massachusetts

References

External links

Lynn Woods information on the City of Lynn website
Bouldering Information and trail map for Lynn Woods
Friends of Lynn Woods website

Historic districts on the National Register of Historic Places in Massachusetts
1881 establishments in Massachusetts
Watersheds of Massachusetts
Landforms of Essex County, Massachusetts
Urban forests in the United States
Forests of Massachusetts
Parks in Essex County, Massachusetts
Lynn, Massachusetts
National Register of Historic Places in Lynn, Massachusetts
Protected areas established in 1881